The Roman Catholic Diocese of Lucknow is a diocese located in the city of Lucknow in the Ecclesiastical province of Agra in India.

The Cathedral School of Lucknow is located in the same compound as St. Joseph's Cathedral.

History
 12 January 1940: Established as Diocese of Lucknow from the Metropolitan Archdiocese of Agra and Diocese of Allahabad

Leadership
 Bishops of Lucknow (Latin Rite)
 Bishop Gerald John Mathias (8 November 2007 – present)
 Bishop Albert D’Souza (later Archbishop) (21 November 1992 – 16 February 2007)
 Bishop Alan Basil de Lastic (later Archbishop) (2 July 1984 – 19 November 1990)
 Bishop Cecil DeSa (later Archbishop) (5 June 1971 – 11 November 1983)
 Bishop Albert Conrad De Vito, O.F.M. Cap. (First Bishop, 12 December 1946 – 16 November 1970)
 Bishop Joseph Angel Poli, O.F.M. Cap. (later Archbishop) (Apostolic Administrator, 1940 – 1946)

References

External links
 GCatholic.org 
 Catholic Hierarchy 
 Diocesan website

Roman Catholic dioceses in India
Christian organizations established in 1940
Christianity in Uttar Pradesh
Roman Catholic dioceses and prelatures established in the 20th century
1940 establishments in India
Lucknow